You've Stolen My Heart is a 2005 studio album from the Kronos Quartet, featuring arrangements of the music of Indian composer Rahul Dev Burman, with vocals by Asha Bhosle, she sang the original versions of the album's songs and was married to Burman until his death in 1994. The album features keyboards, autoharp, and various percussion instruments in addition to the Kronos Quartet's core string quartet instruments. The recordings also feature Indian percussionist Zakir Hussain and Chinese pipa virtuoso Wu Man.

The album features four instrumental tracks, and eight with Bhosle on lead vocals.

The album was nominated for a 2006 Grammy Award for Best Contemporary World Music Album.

Track listing
Dum Maro Dum (Take Another Toke) – 4:43
Rishte Bante Hain (Relationships Grow Slowly) – 6:15
Mehbooba Mehbooba (Beloved, O Beloved) – 3:51
Ekta Deshlai Kathi Jwalao (Light a Match) – 3:59
Nodir Pare Utthchhe Dhnoa (Smoke Rises Across the River) – 6:00
Koi Aaya Aane Bhi De (If People Come) – 5:36
Mera Kuchh Saaman (Some of My Things) – 6:55
Saajan Kahan Jaoongi Main (Beloved, Where Would I Go?) – 5:43
Piya Tu Ab To Aaja (Lover, Come to Me Now) – 5:28
Dhanno Ki Aankhon (In Dhanno's Eyes) – 4:03
Chura Liya Hai Tum Ne (You've Stolen My Heart) – 5:09
Saiyan Re Saiyan (My Lover Came Silently) – 5:49

Personnel

Performers
 Asha Bhosle – vocals (1,2,4,6,7,9,11,12)
 David Harrington – violin (1–12), tambourine (2), mouth percussion (2), bow percussion (2), chang (2), autoharp (2,6,7,8), Korg MS-20 (2), vocal percussion (2,6), hammered violin (4), match (4), frame drum (5), harmonium (5), gongs(6), cymbal (6), triangle (7), piano (9,11), trumpet violin (9), glass (11)
 Hank Dutt – viola (1–12), Farfisa Organ (1,2,7,12), Hohner Pianet (2,4,7,8,9), synthesizer (2,4,5,7,9,12), accordion (3,11) theremin (6), organ (6,8)
 Jennifer Culp – cello (1–12), electric bass (6,10,12)
 John Sherba – violin (1–12), bow percussion (2), hammered violin (4), trumpet violin (4, 6, 11, 12)
 Zakir Hussain – Indian trap set (1,4,11), tambourine (1,4,11), madal (1,3,8,11), tabla (2,4,5,7,8,10), tabla tarang (2,6), batajon (3,9), djembe (6,8,9,12), bass drum (6), shaker (10,12), talking drum (12), frame drum (12)
 Wu Man – pipa (1–4,6–9,11,12), liu qin (2,3,4,11,12), electric sitar (2,7), gong (6)
 Gustavo Santaolalla – vocal (9)
 Scott Fraser – electric sitar (2), guitar (11)
 Judith Sherman – finger cymbals (1)
 James Quinn – breath (1)
 Anand Bhostle – vocal percussion (6)
 Enrique Gonzalez Müeller – vocal percussion (6), breath (9)

Production
 Producer – David Harrington
 Co-producers – Scott Fraser and Judith Sherman
 Executive Producer – Robert Hurwitz
 Engineer – Scott Fraser
 Assistant Engineers – Enrique Gonzalez Müeller (The Plant), Marc Dimmitt (Studio D Recording)
 Mixing – Scott Fraser and David Harrington
 Mastering – Scott Fraser
 Arrangements – David Harrington, except (3,5,8,10) Stephen Prutsman with David Harrington
 Music Preparation – Hank Dutt
 Design – Doyle Partners
 Photography – Gautam Rajadhyaksha

Song notes
 "Dum Maro Dum" (Hindi: दम मारो दम) – Originally featured in the 1971 film Hare Rama Hare Krishna.  Lyrics by Anand Bakshi.
 "Piya Tu Ab To Aaja" (Hindi: पिया तू अब तो आजा) – Originally featured in the 1971 Hindi film Caravan.  Lyrics by Majrooh Sultanpuri.
 "Mehbooba Mehbooba" – Originally featured in the 1975 film Sholay.
 "Dhanno Ki Aankhon" – Originally featured in the 1977 film "Kitaab".
 "Chura Liya Hai" – Originally featured in the 1973 film "Yaadon Ki Baaraat".

See also
List of 2005 albums

References

External links
Nonesuch Records Album Listing
Kronos Quartet with Asha Bhosle on WXPN's World Cafe, Oct 2005

2005 albums
Kronos Quartet albums
Nonesuch Records albums